Michael Fitzgibbon Reid (born November 24, 1970) is a former American football defensive back who played two seasons with the Philadelphia Eagles of the National Football League. He was drafted by the Philadelphia Eagles in the third round of the 1993 NFL Draft. He played college football at North Carolina State University and attended Gettys D. Broome High School in Spartanburg, South Carolina.

References

External links
Just Sports Stats
Mike Reid trading card

Living people
1970 births
Players of American football from South Carolina
American football defensive backs
African-American players of American football
NC State Wolfpack football players
Philadelphia Eagles players
Sportspeople from Spartanburg, South Carolina